Don or Donald Logan may refer to:

Sir Donald Logan (1917–2009), British diplomat
Don Logan (rugby union) (born 1931), Australian rugby union player
Don Logan (born 1944), American media executive
F. Donald Logan (born 1930), American historian